Johnny Symons is a documentary filmmaker focusing on LGBT cultural and political issues. He is a professor in the Cinema Department at San Francisco State University, where he runs the documentary program and is the director and co-founder of the Queer Cinema Project. He received his BA from Brown University and his MA in documentary production from Stanford University. He has served as a Fellow in the Sundance Institute’s Documentary Film Program.

His latest film, Out Run, co-directed with award-winning filmmaker S. Leo Chiang, premiered at the Full Frame Documentary Film Festival and won Best Cinematography for a Feature Length Documentary Film at the Los Angeles Asian Pacific Film Festival. His documentary Daddy & Papa, about the personal, cultural, and political impact of gay men raising children, premiered at the Sundance Film Festival, broadcast on PBS’s Independent Lens, and was nominated for a national Emmy for Best Documentary. Ask Not, his award-winning feature-length documentary about the impact of the "don't ask, don't tell" policy in the US military, also aired on Independent Lens. Beyond Conception, a feature documentary about the relationship between a lesbian surrogate and a gay male couple, broadcast on Discovery Channel. Symons was co-producer of Long Night's Journey Into Day, which won the Grand Jury Prize for Best Documentary at the Sundance Film Festival and was nominated for an Academy Award for Best Feature Documentary.

Filmography 

 OUT RUN (2016)
 ASK NOT (2008)
 BEYOND CONCEPTION (2006)
 DADDY & PAPA (2002)
 BEAUTY BEFORE AGE (1997)
 SHAVING THE CASTRO (1995)
 OUT IN AFRICA (1994)

Awards 
 Presidential Award, San Francisco State University, 2017
 Best Cinematography Award, Los Angeles Asian Pacific Film Festival, 2016 - Out Run
 Artist-in-Residence, Yerba Buena Center for the Arts, 2015-2016
 Groundbreaker Award for Commitment to LGBTQ Family Equality, Our Family Coalition, 2011
 BEST DOCUMENTARY, GLAAD Media Award, 2009 - Ask Not
 Selector’s Choice Award, Melbourne Queer Film Festival, 2009 - Ask Not
 GOLDEN GATE AWARD, Best First Person Documentary, San Francisco International Film Festival, 2002 - Daddy & Papa
 AUDIENCE AWARD FOR BEST DOCUMENTARY, Florida Film Festival, 2002 - Daddy & Papa
 BEST DOCUMENTARY, Miami Gay and Lesbian Film Festival, 2002 - Daddy & Papa
 Certificate of Merit, International Documentary Association, 1998 - Beauty Before Age

References 

Year of birth missing (living people)
Living people
American documentary film directors
LGBT film directors
American LGBT people
San Francisco State University faculty
Brown University alumni